7 Pecados Rurais is a 2013 Portuguese film directed by Nicolau Breyner. It was the Portuguese film with the largest number of admissions in Portugal in 2013 with 281,423.

References

External links

Portuguese comedy films